Darcy Guimarães (19 April 1915 – 1 April 1981) was a Brazilian hurdler. He competed in the men's 110 metres hurdles at the 1936 Summer Olympics.

References

External links
 

1915 births
1981 deaths
Athletes (track and field) at the 1936 Summer Olympics
Brazilian male hurdlers
Olympic athletes of Brazil
Place of birth missing